Acnodon normani, the sheep-pacu, is a species of serrasalmids found in South America. 
It is found in the Amazon, the Xingu and Tocantins River basins in Brazil.

Etymology
The fish is named in honor of ichthyologist J. R. (John Roxborough) Norman (1898-1944), of the British Museum of Natural History, to honor him for his attention to the serrasalmids.

References

Géry, J., 1977. Characoids of the world. Neptune City ; Reigate : T.F.H. [etc.]; 672 p. : ill. (chiefly col.) ; 23 cm. 

Serrasalmidae
Fish of Brazil
Taxa named by William Alonzo Gosline III
Fish described in 1951